Sörby or Sørby may refer to:

Places
 Sörby (Öland), a village in Sweden
 Sörby, Västergötland, a former parish in Sweden for which Floby station was first named
 Sørby, the administrative centre of Våle, a Norwegian village

People
 Kari Sørby, a Norwegian television news anchor
 Kristin Sørby, maiden name of Kristin Vinje
 Mrs. Sørby, a character in the play The Wild Duck by the Norwegian playwright Henrik Ibsen

Other
 Sörby IK, a Swedish football club; see Swedish Football Division 7

See also
 Sorby
 Sarby
 Sørbyhaugen (station)